Iskole is a Sri Lankan teledrama broadcast on TV Derana since 2021. It was released on 8 March 2021 and continues in every weekday from Monday to Friday at 7:30 pm to 8:00 pm. It is written by Saman Edirimunee and Directed by Diluka Prasad Gunathilake.

Plot 
Vihara, a teacher from Colombo gets a transfer to a rural village to teach the poor kids. She is engaged to a wealthy businessman called Roshan. Her parents are both well known doctors and work in Roshan's dad hospital. While Vihara does not have any feelings towards Roshan and does not want to marry him. Her parents repeatedly insist that she marry Roshan, but she resists and tells them that she had enough and she going to take this opportunity to leave home and go to the village. Her parents object at first, later change their mind and let her go. Her mother and she arrive at the village by the car. Suddenly their car is nearly bumped into herd of cows crossing the road and along with them was a man on his motorbike guiding them and that man's name was Randika. After the close accident, they arrive at her boarding house where she was going to stay. The boarding house belongs to Emelyne Hamine, who is like the female head of the village and her family being the only rich family in the whole village. Her younger daughter Nandini and her family live in that house. Also, her middle daughter, Jayamini and her two sons. Since Jayamini works overseas as a maid and her husband leaving them, so she had to leave her two sons, Yahapath and Thameera with her younger sister and mother. Only coming for seasonal visits.

The teacher finally settles in the village and goes to the school to teach, with another new teacher called Aloka, who also got a transfer to the school from Kandy, her hometown. In matter of time, they manage to bond with the students and the staff. Specially, Vihara teacher who is loved by the students of her dancing class for her studious and active personality. She meets a girl called Anagi, who is excellent at dancing and the real reason for her decision to move to the village was that she saw a girl in the newspaper a young girl got chosen for a national dancing competition. But couldn’t go because of family problems and that girl she was looking for turned out to be Anagi, who she discovers was in her class all long. So, she starts teaching Anagi how to dance and bunch of other students during school hours and after hours.
Things run smooth, until they discover that the MP who is in charge of the local district wants to close the village school and move the students into another school. By this, he scares the principal into believing that his pension will be lower when he retires due to the low number of students attending the school. So, Vihara and Aloka teacher form an alliance with a male teacher called Ranthilaka Sir, who is a teacher that was raised in the village and went to the school since he was a child. With this alliance, they seek help from the local education director who is in charge of education department in that area, to promote the message to parents and others that the school shouldn’t close.

Meanwhile, in the midst of everything else Vihara gets to know more about Randika, the man who she had met previously in the close accident. She also gets to know that he is the grandson of Emelyne Hamine. Randika is also praised by everyone for his service to the village since he does a business and helps anyone who’s in need. He has a best friend named Chula, who underwent trouble finding a job and ended up wondering around the village, until Randika offered him a job of being a driver to drive his small truck and be his assistant.

From there the story goes into outline how Vihara struggles to save the school and receives help from Randika and his friends to build an alumni association. It also examines how she is going deal with her parents' insistence that she marry Roshan. Randika falls in love with Vihara but does not accept that he is in love since he had previously had a girlfriend and they broke up.  Also how Vihara adores Thameera and Yahapath as her children since their mother is not present in the country and how they are mistreated by their grandmother and auntie.

Cast

Main cast 

 Damithrie Subasinghe as Vihara 
 Danushka Sampath as Randika
 Naduni Karunathilake as Aloka
 Ravindu Rajasekara as Chethiya
 Dinuja Arya Akeshwara as Thameera
 Vinuk Dewmina as Yahapath
 Nisal Sathsara as Dulan
 Hirushi Perera as Anagi

Supporting cast 

 Susila Kottage as Emelyne Hamine
 Dasun Ediripakshe as Chula 
 Sahan Ranwala as Ranthilaka Sir 
 Bhanu Prabhasha as Roshan
 Sangeetha Basnayake as Vihara's mother
 Ruwanthi Mangala as Jayamini
 Sashrika Semini as Dinuki 
 Wasantha Kumarasiri as Nandani's husband
 Ananda Athukorala as Ranjith
 Sudharshi Galanigama as Chandani
 Roma Roshi Jayakody as Nandani 
 Danushka Jayarathna as Sepalika
 Chirantha Ranwala as Vihara's father
 Wilmon Sirimanne as School Principal Sir
 Deepthi Weerasooriya as Suneth MP
 Ranjith Rubasinghe as Kapila

References

External links 

 Iskole teledrama on TV Derana
 Official Website

Sri Lankan drama television series
2010s television soap operas
TV Derana original programming